"Make No Sense" is a song by American rapper YoungBoy Never Broke Again. It was sent to urban contemporary radio on January 14, 2020 as the third single from his twelfth  mixtape AI YoungBoy 2 (2019). It was produced by Buddah Bless.

Background and composition 
YoungBoy first previewed the song on an Instagram story in January 2019; the song was also previous titled as "Tina Turner". The first line of the chorus ("I feel like I'm Gucci Mane in 2006") is a reference to when a murder charge against Mane was dropped in 2006. YoungBoy sings about the money he has earned, and how some men are pretending to have money or respect him. He also compares jewelry to the price of narcotics and talks about still keeping his thug persona.

Music video 
The music video was released on January 13, 2020.

Charts

Weekly charts

Year-end charts

Certifications

References 

2019 songs
2020 singles
YoungBoy Never Broke Again songs
Songs written by YoungBoy Never Broke Again
Atlantic Records singles
Songs written by Buddah Bless
Song recordings produced by Buddah Bless